Qissat Shakarwati Farmad (alternatively Qissat Shakruti Firmad, literally "Tale of the Great Chera Ruler") is an Arabic manuscript of anonymous authorship, . It is argued that the qissat is the oldest, most detailed, and comprehensive recorded version of the famous Cheraman Perumal legend (of south India). 

The Cheraman Perumal legend traces the introduction of Islam on the Malabar Coast. All muslim sources from 1500 CE tell the story of

 A traditional Hindu spice trader from Kerala, titled the Cheraman Perumal 

 Divided his spice trade among his family and business alliances  
 Sailed for Jeddah with the intent of performing yearly worship at Syrian Petra & Kaaba preislamic holy shrine of the Quraysh pagans, which is muslim equivalent of the hajj 
 Unspecified story hints spice merchant may have died on his return trade journey from Syria to Malabar Coast.

The title Shakarwati Farmad is an Arabic version of the medieval Indian royal title "Chakravarti Cheraman Perumal". The Chera (Spice Merchant)king is also referred within the text as "al-Sultan Shakrawati". The qissat is currently preserved in British Library (India Office Records, MS. Islamic 2807d, fols. 81a-104a).

Versions of the legend 
The later versions of the Cheraman Perumal legend are incorporated by

 Zayn al-Din Makhdum in Tuhfat al-Mujahidin (16th century CE)⁸ and in
 Ta'rikh-i Firishta (Persian, 17th century CE). 

Varied versions of the legend can also be seen 

 A number of medieval Kerala literary sources (such as Keralolpatti) and 
 Portuguese chronicles. 
 A Telugu version of the legend is also mentioned by some scholars.

As per scholar Y. Friedmann, the version famously narrated by Zayn al-Din Makhdum was directly derived from the qissat. Unlike some of the other versions of the legend, large portions of the qissat takes place after the king's death on Arabian coast.

First mosques of Malabar according to the qissat 
According to the qissat, the first mosque was built by Malik ibn Dinar in Kodungallur, while the rest of the mosques were founded by Malik ibn Habib.

References 

Islamic studies

Islam in Kerala